Hyacinth (Hyakinthos; died 108) was a young Christian living at the start of the second century, who is honored as a martyr and a saint by both the Eastern Orthodox Church and the Roman Catholic Church.

According to tradition, he was a native of Caesarea in Cappadocia, a member of a Christian family. As a boy, he was appointed to serve as an assistant to the chamberlain to the Emperor Trajan. His failure to participate in the ceremonial sacrifices to the official Roman gods soon came to be noticed by other members of the Imperial household.

When he was denounced as a Christian, Hyacinth proclaimed his faith. As a result, he was imprisoned and underwent numerous scourgings and tortures. He was deliberately served only food which had been blessed for sacrifice to the gods, the eating of which was banned by both Judaism and Christianity. Thus, he starved to death in 108 AD, dying at the age of twelve. Just before his death, legend says, his jailers saw him being comforted by angels, who bestowed a crown on him.

Hyacinth died in the city of Rome. Later, the saint's relics were transferred to Caesarea.

A jewel-encrusted human skeleton in a gilded glass case labeled "S. HYACINTHUS M." (Saint Hyacinth, Martyr) is preserved and venerated in a secular building that was the Roman Catholic abbey church of the former Cistercian Abbey of Fürstenfeld (in Bavaria, Germany), of which the church is the only surviving structure. The skeleton arrived at Fürstenfeld Abbey at an unknown date. Writing of Europe’s skeletons of “catacomb saints”, art historian Paul Koudounaris states that they “could have been anyone, but they were pulled out of the ground and raised to the heights of glory.”

Many places, people, and other entities are named after Hyacinth (or Jacinto, the Spanish form of "Hyacinth"). See the disambiguation pages in the "See also" section, below.

Hyacinth is not to be confused with the third-century martyr Hyacinth (died c. 257)  or the medieval Polish Dominican saint Hyacinth of Poland.

See also
 St. Hyacinth (disambiguation)
 San Jacinto (disambiguation) (the Spanish form of "Saint Hyacinth")
 Hyacinth (disambiguation)

References

108 deaths
Saints from Roman Anatolia
Cappadocian Greeks
2nd-century Christian martyrs
Year of birth unknown
People from Cappadocia